Endre Boros (born 21 September 1953) is a Hungarian-American mathematician, a Distinguished Professor at Rutgers University in New Brunswick, New Jersey, and the Director of the Center for Operations Research (RUTCOR).   He is the author of 15 book chapters and edited volumes, and 165 research papers. He is Associate Editor of the Annals of Mathematics and Artificial Intelligence, and Editor-in-Chief of both the Annals of Operations Research and Discrete Applied Mathematics.

Results
 settled a conjecture by Beniamino Segre about the cyclic structure of finite projective planes, and  provided the best known bound for a question posed by Paul Erdős about blocking sets of Galois planes.  proved that perfect graphs are kernel solvable which answered a longstanding open question by C. Berge and P. Duchet (and which is independent of the perfect graph theorem).

 uses a network flow based approach for quadratic binary optimization.
In the area of the theory of Horn functions,  proved that all "prime implicates" of a Horn CNF can be generated efficiently, extended Horn logic to q-Horn and showed that this extension forms in some sense the boundary between tractable and intractable logic.

Selected publications
.
.
.
.
.
.
.

References

External links
 
 
 

1953 births
Living people
Hungarian emigrants to the United States
Rutgers University faculty
20th-century American mathematicians
21st-century American mathematicians